Lawrence Casper Boles (September 9, 1883 – August 19, 1945) was an American college football player and coach. He served as the head coach at the College of Wooster from 1915 to 1925 and again from 1927 to 1939, compiling a record of 134–50–19.  Bowles was also the head basketball coach at Wooster from 1915 to 1926, tallying a mark of 86–74.

References

External links
 

1883 births
1945 deaths
Basketball coaches from Ohio
Ohio Wesleyan Battling Bishops football players
Wooster Fighting Scots athletic directors
Wooster Fighting Scots football coaches
Wooster Fighting Scots men's basketball coaches
People from Blanchester, Ohio